East Vassalboro is an unincorporated village in the town of Vassalboro, Kennebec County, Maine, United States. East Vassalboro has a post office with ZIP code 04935.

Notable people
Amy Morris Bradley (1823-1904), educator who established the first English school in Central America.

References

Villages in Kennebec County, Maine
Vassalboro, Maine